Ed Novick is an American sound engineer. He has won an Academy Award for Best Sound and has been nominated for another three in the same category. He has worked on more than 60 films since 1982.

Selected filmography
Novick has won an Academy Award and has been nominated for another three:

Won
 Inception (2010)

Nominated
 Spider-Man (2002)
 The Dark Knight (2008)
 Moneyball (2011)

References

External links

Year of birth missing (living people)
Living people
American audio engineers
Best Sound Mixing Academy Award winners
Best Sound BAFTA Award winners